The 9th CARIFTA Games was held in Hamilton, Bermuda on May 3–4, 1980.

Participation (unofficial)

Detailed result lists can be found on the "World Junior Athletics History" website.  An unofficial count yields the number of about 178 athletes (105 junior (under-20) and 73 youth (under-17)) from about 13 countries:  Antigua and Barbuda (2), Bahamas (41), Barbados (20), Bermuda (34), Cayman Islands (1), Grenada (4), Guyana (3), Jamaica (38), Lesser Antilles (2), Saint Kitts and Nevis (1), Trinidad and Tobago (19), Turks and Caicos Islands (2).

Austin Sealy Award

The Austin Sealy Trophy for the most outstanding athlete of the games was awardeded to Richard Louis from Barbados.  He won 2 gold (200m, 400m) and 1 silver (100m) medals in the youth
(U-17) category.

Medal summary
Medal winners are published by category: Boys under 20 (Junior), Girls under 20 (Junior), Boys under 17 (Youth), and Girls under 17 (Youth).
Complete results can be found on the "World Junior Athletics History" website.

Boys under 20 (Junior)

Girls under 20 (Junior)

Boys under 17 (Youth)

Girls under 17 (Youth)

Medal table (unofficial)

References

External links
World Junior Athletics History

CARIFTA Games
International athletics competitions hosted by Bermuda
1980 in Bermudian sport
CARIFTA
1980 in Caribbean sport